GBI may refer to:

Languages 
 Galela language (ISO 639-3: gbi), native to Indonesia
 Gbi language, native to the Central African Republic and South Sudan
 Gbii language, native to Liberia
 Gbin language, an extinct language of Ivory Coast

Medicine 
 General Behavior Inventory, a psychological test
Genetic disorder, a brain injury
 Great Bodily Injury, physical injury suffered by the victim of a violent crime that causes a substantial risk of death, extended loss or impairment of a body part or function, or permanent disfigurement

Other uses 
 Gbi & Doru District, Nimba County, Liberia
 "GBI: German Bold Italic", a song by Towa Tei featuring Kylie Minogue
 Genius Brands, an American entertainment company
 Georgia Bureau of Investigation, an agency of the U.S. state of Georgia
 Gereja Bethel Indonesia, a group of Christian Pentecostal churches in Indonesia
 Green Bank Interferometer, a radio telescope in West Virginia
 Green Building Initiative
 Ground-Based Interceptor, an American anti-ballistic missile system
 Gulf Bridge International, a Middle Eastern subsea cable operator
General Building Inspector of the Reich Capital, a Nazi office held by Albert Speer

See also 

GB1 (disambiguation) (disambiguation)
GBL (disambiguation)